Iowa Highway 90 (Iowa 90) was a state highway in central Iowa.  The highway was in service to traffic from 1932 through 1981 and took several forms over the years.  It began as a spur route from Des Moines to Commerce, now part of West Des Moines.  At its greatest extent, it extended from Atlantic to Newton along the historical routing of U.S. Highway 6 (US 6).  From 1966 through 1981, the highway existed in its final form—from Interstate 80 (I-80) between Earlham and DeSoto to I-35 on the southern outskirts of West Des Moines.

Route description
Iowa 90 began at an interchange with I-80 between Earlham and DeSoto. The Interstate Highway at this location ran in a south-southwest–to–north-northeast orientation. The Iowa 90 roadway curved northward at the interchange and continued as County Road P58 (CR P58). Just before this intersection it passed over a line of the Rock Island Railroad. It continued east along a section line until it met CR R16 on the southern edge of Van Meter. Prior to 1980, CR R16 was called Iowa 293. The highway eased slightly to the north, putting traffic on a north-northeasterly vector parallel to the Rock Island line. It crossed the Raccoon River just west of Booneville. It entered Polk County to the southwest of West Des Moines. The roadway curved around to cross to the north side of the railroad tracks at a perpendicular level crossing. From there, it continued a short distance to a cloverleaf interchange with I-35. The roadway continued into West Des Moines, and ultimately Des Moines, as Grand Avenue.

Major intersections

References

External links

090
U.S. Route 6